Arsenal Football Club is an English professional football club based in Islington, London. Arsenal plays in the Premier League, the top flight of English football. The club has won 13 league titles (including one unbeaten title), a record 14 FA Cups, two League Cups, 16 FA Community Shields, one European Cup Winners' Cup, and one Inter-Cities Fairs Cup. In terms of trophies won, it is the third-most successful club in English football.

Arsenal was the first club from the South of England to join the Football League in 1893, and they reached the First Division in 1904. Relegated only once, in 1913, they continue the longest streak in the top division, and have won the second-most top-flight matches in English football history. In the 1930s, Arsenal won five League Championships and two FA Cups, and another FA Cup and two Championships after the war. In 1970–71, they won their first League and FA Cup Double. Between 1989 and 2005, they won five League titles and five FA Cups, including two more Doubles. They completed the 20th century with the highest average league position. Between 1998 and 2017, Arsenal qualified for the UEFA Champions League for nineteen consecutive seasons.

Herbert Chapman, who changed the fortunes of Arsenal forever, won the club its first silverware, and his legacy led the club to dominate the 1930s decade; Chapman, however, died of pneumonia in 1934, aged 55. He helped introduce the WM formation, floodlights, and shirt numbers; he also added the white sleeves and brighter red to the club's jersey. Arsène Wenger is the longest-serving manager and won the most trophies. He won a record seven FA Cups, and his title-winning team set an English record for the longest top-flight unbeaten league run at 49 games between 2003 and 2004, receiving the nickname The Invincibles.

In 1886, munitions workers at the Royal Arsenal in Woolwich founded the club as Dial Square. In 1913 the club crossed the city to Arsenal Stadium in Highbury, becoming close neighbours of Tottenham Hotspur, and creating the North London derby. In 2006, they moved to the nearby Emirates Stadium. With an annual revenue of £340.3m in the 2019–20 season, Arsenal was estimated to be worth US$2.68 billion by Forbes, making it the world's eighth most valuable club, while it is one of the most followed on social media. The motto of the club has long been Victoria Concordia Crescit, Latin for "Victory Through Harmony".

History

1886–1919: from Dial Square to Arsenal

In October 1886, Scotsman David Danskin and fifteen fellow munitions workers in Woolwich formed Dial Square Football Club, named after a workshop at the heart of the Royal Arsenal complex. Each member contributed sixpence and Danskin also added three shillings to help form the club. Dial Square played their first match on 11 December 1886 against Eastern Wanderers and won 6–0. The club renamed to Royal Arsenal a month later, and its first home was Plumstead Common, though they spent most of their time playing at the Manor Ground. Their first trophies were the Kent Senior Cup and London Charity Cup in 1889–90 and the London Senior Cup in 1890–91; these were the only county association trophies Arsenal won during their time in South East London. In 1891, Royal Arsenal became the first London club to turn professional.

Royal Arsenal renamed for a second time upon becoming a limited liability company in 1893. They registered their new name, Woolwich Arsenal, with The Football League when the club ascended later that year. Woolwich Arsenal was the first southern member of The Football League, starting out in the Second Division and reaching the First Division in 1904. Falling attendances, due to financial difficulties among the munitions workers and the arrival of more accessible football clubs elsewhere in the city, led the club close to bankruptcy by 1910. Businessmen Henry Norris and William Hall became involved in the club, and sought to move them elsewhere.

In 1913, soon after relegation back to the Second Division, the club moved across the river to the new Arsenal Stadium in Highbury. In 1919, The Football League controversially voted to promote The Arsenal, instead of relegated local rivals Tottenham Hotspur, into the newly enlarged First Division, despite only finishing fifth in the Second Division's last pre-war season of 1914–15. Later that year, The Arsenal started dropping "The" in official documents, gradually shifting its name for the final time towards Arsenal, as it is generally known today.

1919–1953: Bank of England club

With a new home and First Division football, attendances were more than double those at the Manor Ground, and Arsenal's budget grew rapidly. Their location and record-breaking salary offer lured star Huddersfield Town manager Herbert Chapman in 1925. Over the next five years, Chapman built a new Arsenal. He appointed an enduring new trainer Tom Whittaker, implemented Charlie Buchan's new twist on the nascent WM formation, captured young players like Cliff Bastin and Eddie Hapgood, and lavished Highbury's income on stars like David Jack and Alex James. With record-breaking spending and gate receipts, Arsenal quickly became known as the Bank of England club.

Transformed, Chapman's Arsenal claimed their first national trophy, the FA Cup in 1930, and League Championships followed in 1930–31 and 1932–33. Chapman also presided over off the pitch changes: white sleeves and shirt numbers were added to the kit; a Tube station was named after the club; and the first of two opulent, Art Deco stands was completed, with some of the first floodlights in English football. Suddenly, in the middle of the 1933–34 season, Chapman died of pneumonia. His work was left to Joe Shaw and George Allison, who saw out a hat-trick with the 1933–34 and 1934–35 titles, and then won the 1936 FA Cup and 1937–38 title.

World War II meant The Football League was suspended for seven years, but Arsenal returned to win it in the second post-war season, 1947–48. This was Tom Whittaker's first season as manager, after his promotion to succeed Allison, and the club had equalled the champions of England record. They won a third FA Cup in 1950, and then won a record-breaking seventh championship in 1952–53. However, the war had taken its toll on Arsenal. The club had had more players killed than any top flight club, and debt from reconstructing the North Bank Stand bled Arsenal's resources.

1953–1986: Mediocrity, Mee and Neill

Arsenal were not to win the League or the FA Cup for another 18 years. The '53 Champions squad had aged, and the club failed to attract strong enough replacements. Although Arsenal were competitive during these years, their fortunes had waned; the club spent most of the 1950s and 1960s in mid-table mediocrity. Even former England captain Billy Wright could not bring the club any success as manager, in a stint between 1962 and 1966.

Arsenal tentatively appointed club physiotherapist Bertie Mee as acting manager in 1966. With new assistant Don Howe and new players such as Bob McNab and George Graham, Mee led Arsenal to their first League Cup finals, in 1967–68 and 1968–69. Next season saw a breakthrough, with Arsenal's first competitive European trophy, the 1969–70 Inter-Cities Fairs Cup. The season after, Arsenal achieved an even greater triumph with their first League and FA Cup double, and a new champions of England record. This marked a premature high point of the decade; the Double-winning side was soon broken up and the rest of the decade was characterised by a series of near misses, with Arsenal finishing as FA Cup runners up in 1972, and First Division runners-up in 1972–73.

Former player Terry Neill succeeded Mee in 1976. At the age of 34, he became the youngest Arsenal manager to date. With new signings like Malcolm Macdonald and Pat Jennings, and a crop of talent in the side like Liam Brady and Frank Stapleton, the club reached a trio of FA Cup finals (1978 FA Cup, 1979 FA Cup and 1980 FA Cup), and lost the 1980 European Cup Winners' Cup Final on penalties. The club's only trophy during this time was the 1979 FA Cup, achieved with a last-minute 3–2 victory over Manchester United, in a final is widely regarded as a classic.

1986–1996: George Graham

One of Mee's double winners, George Graham, returned as manager in 1986, with Arsenal winning their first League Cup in 1987, Graham's first season in charge. New signings Nigel Winterburn, Lee Dixon and Steve Bould had joined the club by 1988 to complete the "famous Back Four", led by homegrown player Tony Adams. They immediately won the 1988 Football League Centenary Trophy, and followed it with the 1988–89 Football League title, snatched with a last-minute goal in the final game of the season against fellow title challengers Liverpool. Graham's Arsenal won another title in 1990–91, losing only one match, won the FA Cup and League Cup double in 1993, and the European Cup Winners' Cup in 1994. Graham's reputation was tarnished when he was found to have taken kickbacks from agent Rune Hauge for signing certain players, and he was dismissed in 1995. His replacement, Bruce Rioch, lasted for only one season, leaving the club after a dispute with the board of directors.

1996–2018: Wenger years

The club metamorphosed during the tenure of French manager Arsène Wenger, who was appointed in 1996. Attacking football, an overhaul of dietary and fitness practices, and efficiency with money
have defined his reign. Accumulating key players from Wenger's homeland, such as Patrick Vieira and Thierry Henry, Arsenal won a second League and Cup double in 1997–98 and a third in 2001–02. In addition, the club reached the final of the 1999–2000 UEFA Cup, were victorious in the 2003 and 2005 FA Cup finals, and won the Premier League in 2003–04 without losing a single match, an achievement which earned the side the nickname "The Invincibles". This feat came within a run of 49 league matches unbeaten from 7 May 2003 to 24 October 2004, a national record.

Arsenal finished in either first or second place in the league in eight of Wenger's first nine seasons at the club, although they never won the title in two consecutive seasons.
The club had never progressed beyond the quarter-finals of the Champions League until 2005–06; in that season they became the first club from London to reach the final in the competition's fifty-year history, but were beaten 2–1 by Barcelona. In July 2006, they moved into the Emirates Stadium, after 93 years at Highbury.
Arsenal reached the final of the 2007 and 2011 League Cups, losing 2–1 to Chelsea and Birmingham City respectively. The club had not gained a trophy since the 2005 FA Cup until, spearheaded by club record acquisition Mesut Özil, Arsenal beat Hull City in the 2014 FA Cup Final, coming back from a 2–0 deficit to win the match 3–2.
A year later, Arsenal completed another victorious FA Cup campaign, and became the most successful club in the tournament's history by winning their 13th FA Cup in 2016–17. However, in that same season, Arsenal finished fifth in the league, the first time they had finished outside the top four since before Wenger arrived in 1996. After another unspectacular league season the following year, Wenger departed Arsenal on 13 May 2018.

Since 2018: Post-Wenger era 
After conducting an overhaul in the club's operating model to coincide with Wenger's departure, Basque-Spaniard Unai Emery was named as the club's new head coach on 23 May 2018. He became the club's first ever 'head coach' and second manager from outside the United Kingdom. In Emery's first season, Arsenal finished fifth in the Premier League and as runner-up in the Europa League. On 29 November 2019, Emery was dismissed as manager and former player and assistant first team coach Freddie Ljungberg was appointed as interim head coach.

On 20 December 2019, Arsenal appointed former club captain Mikel Arteta as the new head coach. Arsenal finished the league season in eighth, their lowest finish since 1994–95, but beat Chelsea 2–1 to earn a record-extending 14th FA Cup win. After the season, Arteta's title was changed from head coach to manager. On 18 April 2021, Arsenal were announced as a founding club of the breakaway European competition The Super League; they withdrew from the competition two days later amid near-universal condemnation. Arsenal finished the season in eighth place once again, not qualifying for a European competition for the first time in 26 years.

Crest

Unveiled in 1888, Royal Arsenal's first crest featured three cannons viewed from above, pointing northwards, similar to the coat of arms of the Metropolitan Borough of Woolwich (nowadays transferred to the coat of arms of the Royal Borough of Greenwich). These can sometimes be mistaken for chimneys, but the presence of a carved lion's head and a cascabel on each are clear indicators that they are cannons. This was dropped after the move to Highbury in 1913, only to be reinstated in 1922, when the club adopted a crest featuring a single cannon, pointing eastwards, with the club's nickname, The Gunners, inscribed alongside it; this crest only lasted until 1925, when the cannon was reversed to point westward and its barrel slimmed down.

In 1949, the club unveiled a modernised crest featuring the same style of cannon below the club's name, set in blackletter typography, and above the coat of arms of the Metropolitan Borough of Islington and a scroll inscribed with the club's newly adopted Latin motto, Victoria Concordia Crescit – "victory comes from harmony" – coined by the club's programme editor Harry Homer. For the first time, the crest was rendered in colour, which varied slightly over the crest's lifespan, finally becoming red, gold and green. Because of the numerous revisions of the crest, Arsenal were unable to copyright it. Although the club had managed to register the crest as a trademark, and had fought (and eventually won) a long legal battle with a local street trader who sold "unofficial" Arsenal merchandise,
Arsenal eventually sought a more comprehensive legal protection. Therefore, in 2002 they introduced a new crest featuring more modern curved lines and a simplified style, which was copyrightable.
The cannon once again faces east and the club's name is written in a sans-serif typeface above the cannon. Green was replaced by dark blue. The new crest was criticised by some supporters; the Arsenal Independent Supporters' Association claimed that the club had ignored much of Arsenal's history and tradition with such a radical modern design, and that fans had not been properly consulted on the issue.
Until the 1960s, a badge was worn on the playing shirt only for high-profile matches such as FA Cup finals, usually in the form of a monogram of the club's initials in red on a white background.

The monogram theme was developed into an Art Deco-style badge on which the letters A and C framed a football rather than the letter F, the whole set within a hexagonal border. This early example of a corporate logo, introduced as part of Herbert Chapman's rebranding of the club in the 1930s, was used not only on Cup Final shirts but as a design feature throughout Highbury Stadium, including above the main entrance and inlaid in the floors.
From 1967, a white cannon was regularly worn on the shirts, until replaced by the club crest, sometimes with the addition of the nickname "The Gunners", in the 1990s.

In the 2011–12 season, Arsenal celebrated their 125th anniversary. The celebrations included a modified version of the current crest worn on their jerseys for the season. The crest was all white, surrounded by 15 oak leaves to the right and 15 laurel leaves to the left. The oak leaves represent the 15 founding members of the club who met at the Royal Oak pub. The 15 laurel leaves represent the design detail on the six pence pieces paid by the founding fathers to establish the club. The laurel leaves also represent strength. To complete the crest, 1886 and 2011 are shown on either sides of the motto "Forward" at the bottom of the crest.

Colours

For much of Arsenal's history, their home colours have been bright red shirts with white sleeves and white shorts, though this has not always been the case. The choice of red is in recognition of a charitable donation from Nottingham Forest, soon after Arsenal's foundation in 1886. Two of Dial Square's founding members, Fred Beardsley and Morris Bates, were former Forest players who had moved to Woolwich for work. As they put together the first team in the area, no kit could be found, so Beardsley and Bates wrote home for help and received a set of kit and a ball. The shirt was redcurrant, a dark shade of red, and was worn with white shorts and socks with blue and white hoops.

In 1933, Herbert Chapman, wanting his players to be more distinctly dressed, updated the kit, adding white sleeves and changing the shade to a brighter pillar box red. Two possibilities have been suggested for the origin of the white sleeves. One story reports that Chapman noticed a supporter in the stands wearing a red sleeveless sweater over a white shirt; another was that he was inspired by a similar outfit worn by the cartoonist Tom Webster, with whom Chapman played golf.
Regardless of which story is true, the red and white shirts have come to define Arsenal and the team have worn the combination ever since, aside from two seasons. The first was 1966–67, when Arsenal wore all-red shirts; this proved unpopular and the white sleeves returned the following season. The second was 2005–06, the last season that Arsenal played at Highbury, when the team wore commemorative redcurrant shirts similar to those worn in 1913, their first season in the stadium; the club reverted to their normal colours at the start of the next season. In the 2008–09 season, Arsenal replaced the traditional all-white sleeves with red sleeves with a broad white stripe.

Arsenal's home colours have been the inspiration for at least three other clubs. In 1909, Sparta Prague adopted a dark red kit like the one Arsenal wore at the time; in 1938, Hibernian adopted the design of the Arsenal shirt sleeves in their own green and white strip.
In 1941, Luis Robledo, an England-schooled founder of Santa Fe and a fan of Arsenal, selected the main colors for his newly created team. In 1920, Sporting Clube de Braga's manager returned from a game at Highbury and changed his team's green kit to a duplicate of Arsenal's red with white sleeves and shorts, giving rise to the team's nickname of Os Arsenalistas.
These teams still wear those designs to this day.

For many years Arsenal's away colours were white or navy blue. However, in 1968 the FA banned navy shirts (they looked too similar to referees' black kit) so in the 1969–70 season, Arsenal introduced an away kit of yellow shirts with blue shorts. This kit was worn in the 1971 FA Cup Final as Arsenal beat Liverpool to secure the double for the first time in their history. The yellow and blue strip became almost as famous as their iconic red and white home kit. Arsenal reached the FA Cup final again the following year wearing the red and white home strip and were beaten by Leeds United. Arsenal then competed in three consecutive FA Cup finals between 1978 and 1980 wearing their "lucky" yellow and blue strip, which remained the club's away strip until the release of a green and navy away kit in 1982–83. The following season, Arsenal returned to the yellow and blue scheme, albeit with a darker shade of blue than before.

When Nike took over from Adidas as Arsenal's kit provider in 1994, Arsenal's away colours were again changed to two-tone blue shirts and shorts. Since the advent of the lucrative replica kit market, the away kits have been changed regularly, with Arsenal usually releasing both away and third choice kits. During this period the designs have been either all blue designs, or variations on the traditional yellow and blue, such as the metallic gold and navy strip used in the 2001–02 season, the yellow and dark grey used from 2005 to 2007, and the yellow and maroon of 2010 to 2013.
Until 2014, the away kit was changed every season, and the outgoing away kit became the third-choice kit if a new home kit was being introduced in the same year.

Since Puma began manufacturing Arsenal's kits in 2014, new home, away and third kits were released every single season. In the 2017–18 season, Puma released a new color scheme for the away and third kits. The away kit was a light blue, which fades to a darker blue near the bottom, while the third kit was black with red highlight. Puma returned to the original color scheme for the 2018–19 season.

From the 2019–20 season Arsenal's kits are manufactured by Adidas. In the 2020–21 season, Adidas unveiled the new away kit to 
mark the 15-year anniversary since leaving Highbury. The new away kit is white, with a marbled pattern all across to replicate the iconic marble hall in the East stand of Highbury.

Kit suppliers and shirt sponsors

Stadiums

Before joining the Football League, Arsenal played briefly on Plumstead Common, then at the Manor Ground in Plumstead, then spent three years between 1890 and 1893 at the nearby Invicta Ground. Upon joining the Football League in 1893, the club returned to the Manor Ground and installed stands and terracing, upgrading it from just a field. Arsenal continued to play their home games there for the next twenty years (with two exceptions in the 1894–95 season), until the move to north London in 1913.

Widely referred to as Highbury, Arsenal Stadium was the club's home from September 1913 until May 2006. The original stadium was designed by the renowned football architect Archibald Leitch, and had a design common to many football grounds in the UK at the time, with a single covered stand and three open-air banks of terracing. The entire stadium was given a massive overhaul in the 1930s: new Art Deco West and East stands were constructed, opening in 1932 and 1936 respectively, and a roof was added to the North Bank terrace, which was bombed during the Second World War and not restored until 1954.

Highbury could hold more than 60,000 spectators at its peak, and had a capacity of 57,000 until the early 1990s. The Taylor Report and Premier League regulations obliged Arsenal to convert Highbury to an all-seater stadium in time for the 1993–94 season, thus reducing the capacity to 38,419 seated spectators. This capacity had to be reduced further during Champions League matches to accommodate additional advertising boards, so much so that for two seasons, from 1998 to 2000, Arsenal played Champions League home matches at Wembley, which could house more than 70,000 spectators.

Expansion of Highbury was restricted because the East Stand had been designated as a Grade II listed building and the other three stands were close to residential properties. These limitations prevented the club from maximising matchday revenue during the 1990s and first decade of the 21st century, putting them in danger of being left behind in the football boom of that time. After considering various options, in 2000 Arsenal proposed building a new 60,361-capacity stadium at Ashburton Grove, since named the Emirates Stadium, about 500 metres south-west of Highbury. The project was initially delayed by red tape and rising costs, and construction was completed in July 2006, in time for the start of the 2006–07 season. The stadium was named after its sponsors, the airline company Emirates, with whom the club signed the largest sponsorship deal in English football history, worth around £100 million. Some fans referred to the ground as Ashburton Grove, or the Grove, as they did not agree with corporate sponsorship of stadium names. The stadium will be officially known as Emirates Stadium until at least 2028, and the airline will be the club's shirt sponsor until at least 2024. From the start of the 2010–11 season on, the stands of the stadium have been officially known as North Bank, East Stand, West Stand and Clock end. The capacity of the Emirates now stands at 60,704.

Arsenal's players train at the Shenley Training Centre in Hertfordshire, a purpose-built facility which opened in 1999.
Before that the club used facilities on a nearby site owned by the University College of London Students' Union. Until 1961 they had trained at Highbury.
Arsenal's Academy under-18 teams play their home matches at Shenley, while the reserves play their games at Meadow Park, which is also the home of Boreham Wood F.C. Both the Academy under-18 & the reserves occasionally play their big games at the Emirates in front of a crowd reduced to only the lower west stand.

Supporters and rivalries

Arsenal's fanbase are referred to as "Gooners" – the name derived from the club's nickname "The Gunners". Virtually all home matches sell out; in 2007–08 Arsenal had the second-highest average League attendance for an English club (60,070, which was 99.5% of available capacity), and, as of 2015, the third-highest all-time average attendance. Arsenal have the seventh highest average attendance of European football clubs only behind Borussia Dortmund, FC Barcelona, Manchester United, Real Madrid, Bayern Munich, and Schalke. The club's location, adjoining wealthy areas such as Canonbury and Barnsbury, mixed areas such as Islington, Holloway, Highbury, and the adjacent London Borough of Camden, and largely working-class areas such as Finsbury Park and Stoke Newington, has meant that Arsenal's supporters have come from a variety of social classes. Much of the Afro-Caribbean support comes from the neighbouring London Borough of Hackney and a large portion of the South Asian Arsenal supporters commute to the stadium from Wembley Park, North West of the capital. There was also traditionally a large Irish community that followed Arsenal, with the nearby Archway area having a particularly large community, but Irish migration to North London is much lower than in the 1960s or 1970s.

Like all major English football clubs, Arsenal have a number of domestic supporters' clubs, including the Arsenal Football Supporters' Club, which works closely with the club, and the Arsenal Independent Supporters' Association, which maintains a more independent line. The Arsenal Supporters' Trust promotes greater participation in ownership of the club by fans. The club's supporters also publish fanzines such as The Gooner, Gunflash and the satirical Up The Arse!. In addition to the usual English football chants, supporters sing "One-Nil to the Arsenal" (to the tune of "Go West").

There have always been Arsenal supporters outside London, and since the advent of satellite television, a supporter's attachment to a football club has become less dependent on geography. Consequently, Arsenal have a significant number of fans from beyond London and all over the world; in 2007, 24 UK, 37 Irish and 49 other overseas supporters clubs were affiliated with the club. A 2011 report by SPORT+MARKT estimated Arsenal's global fanbase at 113 million. The club's social media activity was the fifth highest in world football during the 2014–15 season.

Rivalries

Arsenal's longest-running and deepest rivalry is with their nearest major neighbour, Tottenham Hotspur; matches between the two are referred to as the North London derby. There also exists a rivalry between Arsenal and Chelsea. In addition, Arsenal and Manchester United developed a strong on-pitch rivalry in the late 1980s, which intensified in the early 2000s when both clubs were competing for the Premier League title.

Mascot
The club mascot is Gunnersaurus Rex, a smiling, 7-foot-tall green dinosaur, who first appeared at a home match against Manchester City in August 1994 (or 1993). He is based on a drawing by then 11-year-old Peter Lovell, whose design and another similar idea won a Junior Gunners contest; his official back story is that he hatched from an egg found during renovations at Highbury.

The same person, Jerry Quy, has been inside the suit from the start; in early October 2020, as part of cost-cutting brought about by the COVID-19 pandemic, the club made him redundant from that and his other part-time job in supporter liaison, together with 55 full-time employees, although they later said Gunnersaurus could return after spectators were allowed back in stadiums. An online fundraiser was begun for Quy, and Mesut Özil offered to pay his salary himself as long as he remains with Arsenal. In November 2020, in advance of COVID-19 regulations being relaxed to allow supporters to attend home games from 3 December, Arsenal announced that Gunnersaurus would return, to be played by a roster of people that could include Quy if he wished.

Ownership and finances

The largest shareholder on the Arsenal board is American sports tycoon Stan Kroenke. Kroenke first launched a bid for the club in April 2007, and faced competition for shares from Red and White Securities, which acquired its first shares from David Dein in August 2007. Red & White Securities was co-owned by Russian billionaire Alisher Usmanov and Iranian London-based financier Farhad Moshiri, though Usmanov bought Moshiri's stake in 2016. Kroenke came close to the 30% takeover threshold in November 2009, when he increased his holding to 18,594 shares (29.9%). In April 2011, Kroenke achieved a full takeover by purchasing the shareholdings of Nina Bracewell-Smith and Danny Fiszman, taking his shareholding to 62.89%. In May 2017, Kroenke owned 41,721 shares (67.05%) and Red & White Securities owned 18,695 shares (30.04%). In January 2018, Kroenke expanded his ownership by buying twenty-two more shares, taking his total ownership to 67.09%. In August 2018, Kroenke bought out Usmanov for £550m. Now owning more than 90% of the shares, he had the required stake to complete the buyout of the remaining shares and become the sole owner. There has been criticism of Arsenal's poor performance since Kroenke took over, which has been attributed to his ownership. Ivan Gazidis was the club's Chief executive from 2009 to 2018.

Arsenal's parent company, Arsenal Holdings plc, operates as a non-quoted public limited company, whose ownership is considerably different from that of other football clubs. Only 62,219 shares in Arsenal have been issued, and they are not traded on a public exchange such as the FTSE or AIM; instead, they are traded relatively infrequently on the ICAP Securities and Derivatives Exchange, a specialist market. On 29 May 2017, a single share in Arsenal had a mid price of £18,000, which sets the club's market capitalisation value at approximately £1,119.9m. Most football clubs are not listed on an exchange, which makes direct comparisons of their values difficult. Consultants Brand Finance valued the club's brand and intangible assets at $703m in 2015, and consider Arsenal an AAA global brand. Business magazine Forbes valued Arsenal as a whole at $2.238 billion (£1.69 billion) in 2018, ranked third in English football. Research by the Henley Business School ranked Arsenal second in English football, modelling the club's value at £1.118 billion in 2015.

Arsenal's financial results for the 2019–20 season showed an after tax loss of £47.8m, due in part to the impact of the COVID-19 pandemic. The Deloitte Football Money League is a publication that homogenises and compares clubs' annual revenue. Deloitte put Arsenal's footballing revenue in 2019 at £392.7m (€445.6m), ranking Arsenal eleventh among world football clubs. Arsenal and Deloitte both listed the match day revenue generated in 2019 by the Emirates Stadium as €109.2m (£96.2m).

In popular culture
Arsenal have appeared in a number of media "firsts". On 22 January 1927, their match at Highbury against Sheffield United was the first English League match to be broadcast live on radio. A decade later, on 16 September 1937, an exhibition match between Arsenal's first team and the reserves was the first football match in the world to be televised live. Arsenal also featured in the first edition of the BBC's Match of the Day, which screened highlights of their match against Liverpool at Anfield on 22 August 1964. Sky's coverage of Arsenal's January 2010 match against Manchester United was the first live public broadcast of a sports event on 3D television.

As one of the most successful teams in the country, Arsenal have often featured when football is depicted in the arts in Britain. They formed the backdrop to one of the earliest football-related novels, The Arsenal Stadium Mystery (1939), which was made into a film in the same year. The story centres on a friendly match between Arsenal and an amateur side, one of whose players is poisoned while playing. Many Arsenal players appeared as themselves in the film and manager George Allison was given a speaking part. The book Fever Pitch by Nick Hornby was an autobiographical account of Hornby's life and relationship with football and Arsenal in particular. Published in 1992, it formed part of the revival and rehabilitation of football in British society during the 1990s. The book was twice adapted for the cinema – the 1997 British film focuses on Arsenal's 1988–89 title win, and a 2005 American version features a fan of baseball's Boston Red Sox.

Arsenal have often been stereotyped as a defensive and "boring" side, especially during the 1970s and 1980s. In the 1997 film The Full Monty the principal characters move forward in a line and raise their hands, deliberately mimicking the Arsenal defence's offside trap, in an attempt to co-ordinate their striptease routine.
Fifteen years later an almost identical scene was included in the 2012 Disney science-fiction film John Carter (director and co-writer Andrew Stanton, a notable overseas supporter of the club), along with other visual cues and oblique dialogue hints and references to the club throughout the film.
Another film reference to the club's defence comes in the film Plunkett & Macleane, in which two characters are named Dixon and Winterburn after Arsenal's long-serving full backs – the right-sided Lee Dixon and the left-sided Nigel Winterburn.

In August 2022, Amazon Prime Video released an eight-episode docuseries called All or Nothing: Arsenal. It documented the club by spending time with the coaching staff and players behind the scenes both on and off the field throughout their 2021–22 season, in which they were the youngest team in the Premier League with an average starting age of 24 years and 308 days – more than a whole year younger than the next team.

In the community
In 1985, Arsenal founded a community scheme, "Arsenal in the Community", which offered sporting, social inclusion, educational and charitable projects. The club support a number of charitable causes directly and in 1992 established The Arsenal Charitable Trust, which by 2006 had raised more than £2 million for local causes. An ex-professional and celebrity football team associated with the club also raised money by playing charity matches. The club launched the Arsenal for Everyone initiative in 2008 as an annual celebration of the diversity of the Arsenal family. In the 2009–10 season Arsenal announced that they had raised a record breaking £818,897 for the Great Ormond Street Hospital Children's Charity. The original target was £500,000.

Save the Children has been Arsenal global charity partner since 2011 and have worked together in numerous projects to improve safety and well-being for vulnerable children in London and abroad. On 3 September 2016 The Arsenal Foundation has donated £1m to build football pitches for children in London, Indonesia, Iraq, Jordan and Somalia thanks to The Arsenal Foundation Legends Match against Milan Glorie at the Emirates Stadium. On 3 June 2018, Arsenal played Real Madrid in the Corazon Classic Match 2018 at the Bernabeu, where the proceeds went to Realtoo Real Madrid Foundation projects that are aimed at the most vulnerable children. In addition there will be a return meeting on 8 September 2018 at the Emirates stadium where proceeds will go towards the Arsenal foundation.

In 2022, Arsenal and Adidas partnered up to launch the "No More Red" campaign to support the long-standing work being done by Arsenal in the Community to help keep young people safe from knife crime and youth violence. To promote the event, the club launched an exclusive all white kit that was not commercially available and only awarded to individuals who are making a positive difference in the community.

Players

First-team squad

Out on loan

Under-23s and Academy

Players to have featured in a first-team matchday squad for Arsenal

Out on loan

Management and staff

Current staff

Arsenal board

Statistics and records

Arsenal's tally of 13 League Championships is the third highest in English football, after Manchester United (20) and Liverpool (19),
and they were the first club to reach a seventh and an eighth League Championship. As of June 2020, they are one of seven teams, the others being Manchester United, Blackburn Rovers, Chelsea, Manchester City, Leicester City and Liverpool, to have won the Premier League since its formation in 1992.

They hold the highest number of FA Cup trophies, with 14. The club is one of only six clubs to have won the FA Cup twice in succession, in 2002 and 2003, and 2014 and 2015.
Arsenal have achieved three League and FA Cup "Doubles" (in 1971, 1998 and 2002), a feat only previously achieved by Manchester United (in 1994, 1996 and 1999).
They were the first side in English football to complete the FA Cup and League Cup double, in 1993.
Arsenal were also the first London club to reach the final of the UEFA Champions League, in 2006, losing the final 2–1 to Barcelona.

Arsenal have one of the best top-flight records in history, having finished below fourteenth only seven times. They have won the second most top flight league matches in English football, and have also accumulated the second most points, whether calculated by two points per win or by the contemporary points value. They have been in the top flight for the most consecutive seasons (95 as of 2020–21). Arsenal also have the highest average league finishing position for the 20th century, with an average league placement of 8.5.

Arsenal hold the record for the longest run of unbeaten League matches (49 between May 2003 and October 2004). This included all 38 matches of their title-winning 2003–04 season, when Arsenal became only the second club to finish a top-flight campaign unbeaten, after Preston North End (who played only 22 matches) in 1888–89. They also hold the record for the longest top flight win streak. Arsenal set a Champions League record during the 2005–06 season by going ten matches without conceding a goal, beating the previous best of seven set by A.C. Milan. They went a record total stretch of 995 minutes without letting an opponent score; the streak ended in the final, when Samuel Eto'o scored a 76th-minute equaliser for Barcelona.

David O'Leary holds the record for Arsenal appearances, having played 722 first-team matches between 1975 and 1993. Fellow centre half and former captain Tony Adams comes second, having played 669 times. The record for a goalkeeper is held by David Seaman, with 564 appearances. Thierry Henry is the club's top goalscorer with 228 goals in all competitions between 1999 and 2012,
having surpassed Ian Wright's total of 185 in October 2005.
Wright's record had stood since September 1997, when he overtook the longstanding total of 178 goals set by winger Cliff Bastin in 1939.
Henry also holds the club record for goals scored in the League, with 175, a record that had been held by Bastin until February 2006.

Arsenal's record home attendance is 73,707, for a UEFA Champions League match against RC Lens on 25 November 1998 at Wembley Stadium, where the club formerly played home European matches because of the limits on Highbury's capacity. The record attendance for an Arsenal match at Highbury is 73,295, for a 0–0 draw against Sunderland on 9 March 1935, while that at Emirates Stadium is 60,161, for a 2–2 draw with Manchester United on 3 November 2007.

Honours

Arsenal's first ever silverware was won as the Royal Arsenal in 1890. The Kent Junior Cup, won by Royal Arsenal's reserves, was the club's first trophy, while the first team's first trophy came three weeks later when they won the Kent Senior Cup. Their first national senior honour came in 1930, when they won the FA Cup. The club enjoyed further success in the 1930s, winning another FA Cup and five Football League First Division titles. Arsenal won their first league and cup double in the 1970–71 season and twice repeated the feat, in 1997–98 and 2001–02, as well as winning a cup double of the FA Cup and League Cup in 1992–93.

Seasons in bold are seasons when the club won a Double of the league and FA Cup, or of the FA Cup and League Cup. The 2003–04 season was the only 38-match league season unbeaten in English football history. A special gold version of the Premier League trophy was commissioned and presented to the club the following season.

As of 29 August 2020

 
  shared record

County FAs

When the FA Cup was the only national football association competition available to Arsenal, the other football association competitions were County Cups, and they made up many of the matches the club played during a season. Arsenal's first first-team trophy was a County Cup, the inaugural Kent Senior Cup. Arsenal became ineligible for the London Cups when the club turned professional in 1891, and rarely participated in County Cups after this. Due to the club's original location within the borders of both the London and Kent Football Associations, Arsenal competed in and won trophies organised by each.

Other

During Arsenal's history, the club has participated in and won a variety of pre-season and friendly honours. These include Arsenal's own pre-season competition the Emirates Cup, begun in 2007. During the wars, previous competitions were widely suspended and the club had to participate in wartime competitions. During WWII, Arsenal won several of these.

UEFA club coefficient ranking
In European football, the UEFA coefficients are statistics used for ranking and seeding teams in club and international competitions. Club coefficients are used to rank individual clubs for seeding in the UEFA Champions League, UEFA Europa League, and since 2021, the UEFA Europa Conference League.

Arsenal Women
 
Arsenal Women is the women's football club affiliated to Arsenal. Founded as Arsenal Ladies F.C. in 1987 by Vic Akers, they turned semi-professional in 2002 and have been managed since 2021 by Jonas Eidevall; Akers holds the role of Honorary President of Arsenal Women. As part of the festivities surrounding their 30th anniversary in 2017, the club announced that they were changing their formal name to Arsenal Women F.C., and would use "Arsenal" in all references except rare cases where there might be confusion with the men's side.

Arsenal Women are the most successful team in English women's football having won a total of 58 trophies. In the 2008–09 season, they won all three major English trophies – the FA Women's Premier League, FA Women's Cup and FA Women's Premier League Cup, and, as of 2017, were the only English side to have won the UEFA Women's Cup or UEFA Women's Champions League, having won the Cup in the 2006–07 season as part of a unique quadruple. The men's and women's clubs are formally separate entities but have close ties; Arsenal Women are entitled to play at the Emirates Stadium, though they usually play their home matches at Meadow Park in Borehamwood.

Footnotes

References

Works cited

Further reading

External links

 
 

 
1886 establishments in England
Association football clubs established in 1886
Companies formerly listed on the Alternative Investment Market
Sport in the London Borough of Islington
EFL Cup winners
FA Cup winners
Football clubs in England
Football clubs in London
Former English Football League clubs
G-14 clubs
Kroenke Sports & Entertainment
Premier League clubs
UEFA Cup Winners' Cup winning clubs
Inter-Cities Fairs Cup winning clubs